The Shanghai–Hangzhou railway, also known as the Huhang railway, is a double-track railroad in eastern China between Shanghai and Hangzhou in Zhejiang Province. Its name in Chinese, the Huhang Line, is named after the railway's two terminal cities: Shanghai, whose Chinese character abbreviation is hu, and Hangzhou. Cities along the route include Shanghai, Jiaxing and Hangzhou. The line now forms part of the Shanghai–Kunming railway.

Line history
In 1898, the Qing government of China granted to Britain a concession to build a railway between Shanghai and Hangzhou. This concession drew strong domestic opposition against foreign ownership of railways. In 1905, the Qing government's railway construction policy shifted in favor of local provincial governments. Jiangsu and Zhejiang provinces received approval to build the Shanghai–Hangzhou railway and raised 4.84 and 3.88 million silver dollars, respectively, for the project through chartered companies. Construction began in September 1906 on the western (Hangzhou–Fengjing) section and in February 1907 on the eastern (Fengjing–Shanghai) section. The western section entered into operation in April 1909, the two sections were joined together in June and through-train operation began in July.

After the Xinhai Revolution, the national government purchased the railway from the two province-chartered companies, and in 1915, the line was extended in Shanghai to join with the Shanghai–Nanjing railway at the Shanghai North railway station.  

During World War II, the line was bombed and rebuilt by the Japanese occupying forces. In the Chinese Civil War, Nationalist forces destroyed 16 bridges on the line to stall the Communist advance on Shanghai in the spring of 1949. Service was restored on August 1, 1949, and the bridges were fully rebuilt in 1950. The line was electrified from 2004 to 2006. In 2007, during the Sixth Railway Speed-Up Campaign, the line was organized into the Shanghai–Kunming railway.

Rail connections
 Shanghai: Beijing–Shanghai railway
 Hangzhou: Xiaoshan–Ningbo railway, Xuancheng–Hangzhou railway, Zhejiang–Jiangxi railway

See also

 List of railways in China

References

Railway lines in China
Rail transport in Zhejiang
Rail transport in Shanghai
Railway lines opened in 1909